Charles Lollar (born June 22, 1971) is an American businessman and Republican Party politician. A former Marine Corps officer, he was the Republican nominee for Maryland's 5th congressional district in 2010, losing to Democratic incumbent Steny Hoyer. After coming third in the Republican primary for Governor of Maryland in the 2014 election, he ran for the Charles County Board of Commissioners, losing to Democratic Commissioner Ken Robinson.

Career
Lollar served in the Marine Corps from 1997 to 2003. He was deployed to the Balkans from March through October 1999 as part of Operation Joint Endeavor. Leaving active duty in July 2003, he joined the reserves and served as an intelligence officer at Headquarters Marine Corps. He was then general manager for facility services corporation Cintas. As of July 2014, he works as a budgeting and political consultant for government contractor Blackson Arrow.

Political campaigns 
In his first political campaign, which took place in 2004, Lollar lost a bid for the Gwinnett County, Georgia school board.

Lollar, a Tea Party Republican, subsequently moved to Maryland and served as Chair of the Charles County Republican Central Committee. He planned to run for Governor of Maryland in the 2010 election, but was prevented from doing so by the state's requirement that a candidate must have been registered to vote in Maryland for five years. Instead, he sought the Republican nomination to challenge Democratic incumbent Steny Hoyer in Maryland's 5th congressional district. Lollar won the Republican primary in September 2010 with 58% of the vote. In the general election, Hoyer was re-elected with 64.3% of the vote to Lollar's 34.6%.

Lollar subsequently became the director of the Maryland chapter of Americans for Prosperity, the head of the PAC New Day Maryland, spoke at Second Amendment and anti-tax rallies and served as a delegate to the 2012 Republican National Convention.

On September 2, 2013, Lollar announced he was running for the Republican nomination for Governor of Maryland in the 2014 election at an event in Mechanicsville. He raised $65,000 during the whole of 2013 and reported $5,700 cash-on-hand at the end of the year. On February 24, 2014, Lollar announced that his running mate was Kenneth R. Timmerman, an investigative reporter, conservative activist and the Republican nominee for Maryland's 8th congressional district in 2012.

In the primary held on June 24, 2014, Lollar finished third out of the four candidates with 15.5% of the vote, behind Larry Hogan and David R. Craig, who received 43% and 29.1%, respectively, but ahead of Ron George, who received 12.4%.

After his defeat, Lollar announced he would seek the district 1 seat on the Charles County Board of Commissioners, replacing fellow Republican J.T. Crawford on the ballot, who had withdrawn because of work and family commitments. He faced incumbent Democratic Commissioner Ken Robinson in the general election. Lollar, using money left over from his gubernatorial campaign, outspent Robinson and promised to freeze taxes without affecting services, though he offered no specifics as to how he would accomplish this. Lollar was defeated by Robinson by 19,112 votes (42.7%) to 25,467 (57%).

Personal life
Lollar and his wife, Rosha, have four daughters. They live in Newburg, Maryland.

References

External links
 

1971 births
African-American people in Maryland politics
Maryland Republicans
Living people
People from Toppenish, Washington
Military personnel from Washington (state)
United States Marine Corps officers
Emory University alumni
Kennesaw State University alumni
Regent University alumni
Tea Party movement activists
Georgia (U.S. state) Republicans
21st-century African-American politicians
21st-century American politicians
20th-century African-American people